Wincate Kaari Kinyua (born 13 November 1999), known as Wincate Kaari, is a Kenyan footballer who plays as a defender for Thika Queens and the Kenya women's national team.

International career
Kaari capped for Kenya at senior level during the 2020 CAF Women's Olympic Qualifying Tournament (second round).

See also
List of Kenya women's international footballers

References

External links

1999 births
Living people
People from Kiambu County
Kenyan women's footballers
Women's association football defenders
Kenya women's international footballers